Trictena atripalpis, also known as bardee (bardy, bardi) grub, rain moth or waikerie is a moth of the family Hepialidae. It is found in the whole southern half of Australia.

Habitat
The rain moth is found right across southern Australia in woodland areas alongside creeks and gullies, especially near eucalyptus trees.

Larvae
The caterpillar is used extensively by fishermen as bait. This is where the common name "bardee", "bardi", "badee", or "bargi grub" is derived from. This name is also used for the larva of the beetle Bardistus cibarius (Cerambycidae), as well as various ground dwelling and wood boring moth larvae.

The larvae live in tunnels, feeding on Casuarina pauper and Eucalyptus species, especially Eucalyptus camaldulensis. They are herbivores.

Moth
The other common name, "rain moth", stems from the fact that adults often emerge after rain, typically in autumn, leaving the empty pupal cases sticking up out of the ground.

The moths have fawn coloured wings with two silver flash markings across each fore wing. They can be the same size as a small insectivorous bat, and owls often prey on them. The body reaches a length of 120 mm.

The adult females produce a great number (up to 40,000) of eggs, which are scattered while flying. Their flight months are in Autumn (April to June).

References

Hepialidae
Moths of Australia
Moths described in 1856